was a Japanese tea master and priest who was active in the Ryukyu Kingdom.

Kian was born in Sakai, Izumi Province, Japan. He studied tea ceremony from Kōin, a disciple of Sen no Rikyū. Later, he learned Waka and Classical Chinese poetry.

Kian came to Ryukyu at the age of 35. He enjoyed a widespread reputation there and several years later he was appointed Chamberlain of the palace and was given the Chinese style surname, .

In the spring of 1609, Satsuma Domain invaded Ryukyu and captured the strategically important Nakijin Castle. Kian went there to request a peace negotiation together with a Buddhist monk named Kikuin, but they were arrested by Satsuma troops. After the war, he was taken to Kagoshima together with King Shō Nei and a number of high officials by Satsuma troops. After Shō Nei returned to Ryukyu, Kian was appointed "imperial tea master".

Kian wrote a Gunki monogatari called  during King Shō Hō's reign. It is a very important account of Satsuma's invasion.

References

1566 births
1653 deaths
Chadō
Japanese tea masters
16th-century Japanese people
17th-century Japanese people
16th-century Ryukyuan people
17th-century Ryukyuan people
People of the Ryukyu Kingdom
Ueekata
People from Sakai, Osaka
Buddhism in the Ryukyu Islands